"The Bonnie Banks o' Loch Lomond", or "Loch Lomond" for short, is a Scottish song (Roud No. 9598). The song prominently features Loch Lomond, the largest Scottish loch, located between the council areas of West Dunbartonshire, Stirling and Argyll and Bute. In Scots, "bonnie" means "attractive", "beloved", or "dear".

Lyrics

By yon bonnie banks and by yon bonnie braes,
Where the sun shines bright on Loch Lomond,
Where me and my true love were ever wont to gae,
On the bonnie, bonnie banks o' Loch Lomond.

Chorus:
O ye'll tak' the high road, and I'll tak' the low road,
And I'll be in Scotland afore ye,
But me and my true love will never meet again,
On the bonnie, bonnie banks o' Loch Lomond.

'Twas there that we parted, in yon shady glen,
On the steep, steep side o' Ben Lomond,
Where in soft purple hue, the highland hills we view,
And the moon coming out in the gloaming.

Chorus

The wee birdies sing and the wildflowers spring,
And in sunshine the waters are sleeping.
But the broken heart it kens nae second spring again,
Though the waeful may cease frae their grieving.

Chorus

Interpretation
Historian Murray G. H. Pittock writes that the song "is a Jacobite adaptation of an eighteenth-century erotic song, with the lover dying for his king, and taking only the 'low road' of death back to Scotland." It is one of many poems and songs that emerged from Jacobite political culture in Scotland.

Andrew Lang
About 1876, the Scottish poet and folklorist Andrew Lang wrote a poem based on the song titled "The Bonnie Banks o' Loch Lomond". The title sometimes has the date "1746" appended—the year of the defeat of Bonnie Prince Charlie's rebellion and the hanging of some of his captured supporters. Lang's poem begins

Morag—great one in Gaelic—referred to Bonnie Prince Charlie, who fled to France after his forces were defeated. Lawing means reckoning in Scots. The poem continues:

Wuddy means hangman's rope, according to Lang's own notes on the poem; dawing is dawn. The poem continues with the song's well-known chorus, then explains why the narrator and his true love will never meet again:

The poem's narrator vows to take violent revenge on the English:

"Sergeant Môr" is John Du Cameron, a supporter of Bonnie Prince Charlie who continued fighting as an outlaw until he was hanged in 1753.

Irish variant 
The Irish variant of the song is called "Red Is the Rose" and is sung with the same melody but different (although similarly themed) lyrics. It was popularized by Irish folk musician Tommy Makem. Even though many people mistakenly believe that Makem wrote "Red Is the Rose", it is a traditional Irish folk song.

Arrangements and recordings
"Loch Lomond" has been arranged and recorded by many composers and performers over the years, in several genres ranging from traditional Scottish folk to barbershop to rock and roll.

Classical music 
Ralph Vaughan Williams made an arrangement for baritone solo and unaccompanied male choir in 1921. It has been recorded several times, notably by the tenor Ian Partridge and the London Madrigal Singers for EMI in 1970.

Popular music 
Scottish folk-rock band Runrig have made the song their unofficial anthem, closing their concerts with a rendition for over 25 years. Two verses of the song and the chorus are now a favourite anthem of the supporters of the Scotland rugby team and also of the Tartan Army, the supporters of the Scotland football team, and as such are fixtures including at the respective teams' home games at Murrayfield Stadium in Edinburgh and Hampden Park in Glasgow. One re-recorded version in 2007 for BBC Children in Need that featured both Runrig and the Tartan Army peaked at number nine on the UK Singles Chart and number one in Scotland. In April 2022, their recording was certified silver by the British Phonographic Industry (BPI) for sales and streams exceeding 200,000 units. Possibly taking a cue from Runrig, and sung at a faster marching pace, the original sad lament is enthusiastically bellowed out by thousands of Scots to celebrate a score and to spur on the team.

Jazz
The Jazz Discography, an online index of studio recordings, live recordings, and broadcast transcriptions of jazz – as of May 22, 2019 – lists 106 recordings of "Loch Lomond" and one recording of "Bonnie Banks o' Loch Lomond".

A notable big band version of "Loch Lomond", arranged by Claude Thornhill, was recorded in a live performance on January 16, 1938, by the Benny Goodman and His Orchestra on the album, The Famous 1938 Carnegie Hall Jazz Concert, on January 16, 1938, featuring Martha Tilton on vocals (Columbia SL 160).

Jazz singer Maxine Sullivan, for whom it was a career-defining hit, recorded it at least 14 times:

 Her first on August 6, 1937, with Claude Thornhill (piano), Frankie Newton (trumpet), Buster Bailey (clarinet), Pete Brown (alto sax), Babe Russin (tenor sax), John Kirby (bass), and O'Neil Spencer (drums) (matrix 21472-1; Vocalion-OKeh 364); and
 Her last, in a live performance at the Fujitsu-Concord Jazz Festival in Tokyo, on September 28, 1986, with the Scott Hamilton Quintet. It was her second to last recording. She died  months later, on April 7, 1987.

TV and film 
In Our Gang Follies of 1938, an American short musical film by Hal Roach, Annabelle Logan (Annie Ross) sings a rendition of “Loch Lomond” at the local talent show.

In the 1945 Sherlock Holmes film, Pursuit to Algiers, starring Basil Rathbone, Dr. Watson (Nigel Bruce) sings a rendition of "Loch Lomond" accompanied by Sheila Woodbury (Marjorie Riordan) on the piano.

In the 1955 Disney animated classic Lady and the Tramp, one of its characters, Jock, a Scottish terrier, renders his own version of "The Bonny Banks Of Loch Lomond" when collecting his bones "in the back yard".

The song is heard in the 1963 Disney film The Three Lives of Thomasina.

A recording of a Scotsman singing the song in captivity during the First World War featured in the 2007 BBC documentary How the Edwardians Spoke.

In the children’s cartoon, Animaniacs, it is heard in ”Ups and Downs” as Wakko and Dr. Scratchansniff ride the elevator.. It is also heard in ”Wakko's Wish”.

In the 2021 film A Castle for Christmas it is sung by the cast during a pub scene.

In the American TV series The Simpsons, Groundskeeper Willie whistles the melody in the episode "Lard of the Dance".

In the Hal Roach short comedy film Tit for Tat, Stan Laurel sings a verse of this song after Oliver Hardy declares in a verbal altercation with his neighbor that he will take the "high road" and walk away.

References

External links

 Song Histories by Robert Ford (1846–1905), William Hodge & Company (1900). .
 Vagabond Songs and Ballads of Scotland (new and improved ed.), by Robert Ford (1846–1905), Alexander Gardner (1899). 
 Vagabond Songs and Ballads of Scotland by Robert Ford (1846–1905), Alexander Gardner (1904). .

1841 in Scotland
1841 songs
Benny Goodman songs
Jacobite rising of 1745
Loch Lomond
Number-one singles in Scotland
Scottish folk songs
Songs about rivers